The Pate Baronetcy, of Sysonby in the County of Leicester, was a title in the Baronetage of England.  It was created on 28 October 1643 for John Pate.  The title became extinct on his death in 1659.

Pate baronets, of Sysonby (1643)
Sir  John Pate, 1st Baronet (died 1659)

References

Extinct baronetcies in the Baronetage of England